Parliamentary elections were held in Egypt on 24–25 October and 7–8 November 2020 to elect the House of Representatives.

Date
The elections were initially expected to be held in April or May 2020. President Abdel Fattah el-Sisi ordered parliament to freeze its activities on 1 October 2019 and placed the National Security Agency (NSA) in charge of creating lists of candidates as the General Intelligence Directorate (GID) had not satisfactorily selected candidates in the previous election. The For the Love of Egypt list was closely associated with the GID.

The final results will be announced by the National Elections Authority on 14 December 2020.

Electoral system
A total of 568 seats will be elected in a form of parallel voting; 284 of them will be elected using a two-round system in 142 constituencies and the other 284 will be elected using party lists in four constituencies.

PR Constituencies

TR Constituencies

Parties
One alliance that will contest the election, called the National Unified Coalition, includes the Nation's Future Party, New Wafd Party, the Homeland Defenders Party, Modern Egypt Party, the Egyptian Social Democratic Party, the Republican People's Party, the Reform and Development Misruna Party, Tagammu, the Generation's Will, the Egyptian Freedom, the Justice, and the Conference Party parties. Other lists include the Call of Egypt and the Sons of Egypt.

Many different figures, including Zyad Elelaimy, Hisham Fouad, Omar El-Shenety and Hossam Moanis, were arrested on 25 June 2019 on charges of "bringing down the state"; however, the people involved were part of an alliance called the Coalition of Hope that was considering contesting the parliamentary election. Other organizations involved in the alliance included the Civil Democratic Movement. One source indicated that the reason for the arrests was the unwillingness of the alliance to cooperate with the NSA.

Process

First Phase

Number of seats for women 
and political parties they belong to in the 1st phase of the House of Representatives elections in Egypt; detailed in diagram:

Second Phase

Final seat distribution

References

Egypt parliamentary
Parliamentary election
Parliamentary election
Parliamentary election
Parliamentary election
Elections in Egypt
Election and referendum articles with incomplete results